Hawi may refer to:

 Al-Hawi, Hadhramaut, a village in eastern Yemen
 Hawi, Hawaii
 Hawi (film), a 2010 film

People with the surname
 George Hawi, Lebanese politician 
 Khalil Hawi, Lebanese poet
 William Hawi, Lebanese politician

Arabic-language surnames